Wulgai is a village in Pishin District, Balochistan province, Pakistan. It lies on the Wulgai formation - the land containing shale and limestone formations.

References

Populated places in Pishin District